The SpVgg Greuther Fürth II is the reserve team of the German association football club SpVgg Greuther Fürth from the city of Fürth, Bavaria.

Since 2008, it plays in the tier four Regionalliga Süd. The team plays as an under-23 side as the rules on using under-23 players in the first and second teams are less strict.

History
The side originated as the reserve team of the SpVgg Fürth, a club that merged with TSV Vestenbergsgreuth in 1996 to form the current SpVgg Greuther Fürth. The side was known as SpVgg Fürth Amateure or SpVgg Fürth II, depending whether the first team was playing in professional football or not at the time.

Under the name of SpVgg Fürth Amateure the side achieved promotion to the third division Amateurliga Bayern North in 1958 after a championship in the northern division of the 2nd Amateurliga Mittelfranken. The team lasted for only two seasons at this level, coming 12th in 1959 and last in the following year and being relegated back down.

The amateur team of SpVgg Fürth was not a founding member of the Landesliga Bayern-Nord in 1963, unlike the second team of traditional rival 1. FC Nürnberg, and did not appear in the higher reaches of Bavarian football in the years to come.

With the decline of the senior team in the 1980s, which suffered at first relegation from the 2. Bundesliga in 1983, followed by another drop, from the Bayernliga to the Landesliga in 1987, the fortunes of the reserve side declined, too. When the senior team recovered, returning to the Bayernliga in 1991 and becoming a founding member of the new Regionalliga Süd in 1994, the reserve team improved, too. In 1994, the side earned promotion to the tier-five Bezirksoberliga Mittelfranken, having finished runners-up in the Bezirksliga Mittelfranken-Nord.

While in the Bezirksoberliga, the team changed its name to SpVgg Greuther Fürth Amateure in 1996, after the merger and promotion of the senior team. It played as a top-level side in this league until 1999–2000, when a league title earned it promotion to the Landesliga.

The side played for only one season at this level, taking out another league title immediately and earning another promotion, to the Bayernliga. At this level, the side remained until 2008, when the introduction of the 3. Liga allowed for five Bavarian teams to be promoted to the Regionalliga, with runners-up SpVgg Greuther Fürth II being one of them.

In between, in 2005, a change in the rules meant that all reserve sides, regardless of the status of the first team, would now carry a Roman numeral to indicate its status, SpVgg Greuther Fürth Amateure therefore became SpVgg Greuther Fürth II.

From 2008, the team has played in the tier-four Regionalliga Süd, with a fourth place in 2010–11 as its best result. In 2012, the league was restructured, so they moved to the Regionalliga Bayern where they finished in mid table in its first two seasons there.

Honours
The club's honours:

League
 2. Amateurliga Mittelfranken Nord (IV)
 Champions: 1958
 Bayernliga (IV)
 Runners-up: (2) 2007, 2008
 Landesliga Bayern-Mitte (V)
 Champions: 2001
 Bezirksoberliga Mittelfranken (VI)
 Champions: 2000
 Runners-up: 1997
 Bezirksliga Mittelfranken-Nord
 Runners-up: 1994
 Bezirksliga Mittelfranken-Süd
 Runners-up: 1969

Cup
 Mittelfranken Cup
 Winner: 2002
 Runners-up: 2007

Recent managers
The clubs recent managers were:

Recent seasons
The recent season-by-season performance of the club:

With the introduction of the Bezirksoberligas in 1988 as the new fifth tier, below the Landesligas, all leagues below dropped one tier. With the introduction of the Regionalligas in 1994 and the 3. Liga in 2008 as the new third tier, below the 2. Bundesliga, all leagues below dropped one tier. With the establishment of the Regionalliga Bayern as the new fourth tier in Bavaria in 2012 the Bayernliga was split into a northern and a southern division, the number of Landesligas expanded from three to five and the Bezirksoberligas abolished. All leagues from the Bezirksligas onward were elevated one tier.

References

Sources
 Grüne, Hardy (2001).  Vereinslexikon. Kassel: AGON Sportverlag 
 Die Bayernliga 1945–97  DSFS, published: 1998

External links
 Official website  
 SpVgg Greuther Fürth II at Weltfussball.de  
 Das deutsche Fußball-Archiv historical  German domestic league tables
 Manfreds Fussball Archiv  Tables and results from the Bavarian amateur leagues

Football clubs in Germany
Bavarian reserve football teams
Football in Middle Franconia
Reserves
Greuther
German reserve football teams